

Steel

refs:

East Coast

Gulf Coast

West Coast

 See also
 Seattle-Tacoma Shipbuilding Corporation#Shipbuilding in Puget Sound
 Moore Dry Dock Company#Shipbuilding in Oakland and Alameda

Great Lakes

Contracts and Cancellations

Wood

East Coast

Gulf Coast

West Coast

Great Lakes

Contracts and Cancellations

Downey Shipbuilding Corporation

 (approximate)

refs:

Atlantic Corp.

refs:

Texas Shipbuilding Company

refs:

Terry Shipbuilding Company

refs:

Union Construction Company

The Union Construction Company was a shipyard in Oakland's Outer Harbor, Oakland, California, that existed between 1918 and 1930.

For the United States Shipping Board
 10 of 84 Design 1015 ships in 1919 and 1920: Hatchie (#1461) ... Heber (#1470)

For the Anglo-Saxon Petroleum Company
 4 tankers in 1921: Acardo, Achatina, Ampullaria, Amalthus

For Standard Oil of California
 2 tankers in 1920 and 1921: Charlie Watson, R. J. Hanna

For the US Coast Guard
 4 of 4 Tampa-class cutters
  (1921)
  (1921)
  (1921)
  (1922)
  (1922)

refs:

Ames Shipbuilding and Drydock Company

refs:

A relatively high proportion of ships built in the Ames yard saw service during World War II as Empire ships.

Seattle North Pacific Shipbuilding Corporation

formerly the Erickson Engineering Company of Seattle, contractor for 10 9,400-ton ships

refs:

All ships are Design 1015 9,400dwt steel cargo vessels.

Pacific Coast Shipbuilding Company

in Bay Point, California

not to be confused with Pacific Coast Engineering.

The town of Clyde, California was built as a company town to house workers. At the time it consisted of 103 houses and one hotel that could house 150. When the shipyard closed in 1921, Clyde was among potential sites that could be used as homes for disabled veterans.

Dollut & Williams Shipbuilding Company

 (approximate)

refs:

Pensacola Shipbuilding Company

 (approximate)

refs:

Kruse & Banks Shipbuilding Company

ref:

Grays Harbor Motorship Corporation

ref:

McEachern Shipbuilding, Astoria

ref:

Meacham & Babcock, Seattle

ref:

Nielson & Kelez, Seattle

On the Seattle waterfront, south of the Skinner & Eddy yard.

ref:

Pacific American Fisheries, Bellingham

ref:

Wilson Shipbuilding, Astoria

Only produced for the EFC.

8 1001 hulls.

Wright Shipyards, Tacoma

Only produced for the EFC.

6 1001 ships and one 1001 barge.

Peninsula Shipbuilding, Portland

ref:

Seaborn Shipyards, Tacoma

ref:

Sloan Shipyards, Anacortes

ref:

Sommerstrom Bros., Columbia City

ref:

Patterson MacDonald, Seattle

References

Shipyards of the United States
World War I ships of the United States
Lists of ships of the United States